This is a list of television series produced, owned, and/or distributed by Entertainment One, a subsidiary of Hasbro, with its sale pending.

Entertainment One

Gaylord Production Company

Barna-Alper Productions

Blueprint Entertainment

Paperny Entertainment

Force Four Entertainment

Renegade 83

The Mark Gordon Company

Whizz Kid Entertainment

eOne Kids & Family

Hasbro Entertainment

Hasbro Studios/Allspark

Sunbow Entertainment

Saban Brands

See also 
 Allspark (company)
 List of films based on Hasbro properties

References 

Hasbro
Television series by Hasbro Studios
Television series by Entertainment One